Fireworks policy in the European Union is aimed at harmonising and standardising the EU member states' policies on the regulation of production, transportation, sale, consumption and overall safety of fireworks across the European Union.

History 
After a 2003 consultation, the European Commission introduced a proposal for a European guideline to harmonise the international trade in and safety of fireworks on 11 October 2005. The proposal classified fireworks into four categories on the European level. It stipulated that Category 4 is exclusively meant for professional usage, and that member states are allowed to limit the sale of fireworks to the public concerning the categories 2 and 3. The proposed minimal requirements for age limits can be heightened by the member states.

This led to the 'Pyrotechnic articles' Directive in 2007, which was to be embedded into the member states' laws by 4 January 2010, to be applied by 4 July 2010 to fireworks of category 1, 2 and 3, and to be applied to all other pyrotechnic articles by 4 July 2013. On 12 June 2013, a new 'Pyrotechnic articles' Directive was adopted, which the Member States were to enact in national law by 4 July 2017.

Since 2010, safety testing of fireworks is required in the entire Union, but companies are allowed to test their products in one member state before importing and selling them in another. A 2010 document from the Dutch Ministry of Infrastructure and Environment revealed that several fireworks importers in the Netherlands did not yet comply to the new testing regulations, but were not penalised for it, because a number of companies claimed they needed more time to implement the changes and were granted exceptions by the Ministry. Dream Fireworks owner Frits Pen, who claimed to have had his fireworks tested in Hungary for thousands of euros, sued the Ministry for failing to punish his competitors who were allowed to import and sell untested fireworks for free. In 2014, the Ministry stated that, by then, 80% of the fireworks imported into the Netherlands had a CE marking and were being checked.

Reason

In life, people will set off "fireworks" to express their blessings and joy at certain times (such as New Year), when they enjoy victory, or on festive days, but fireworks are restricted now. The main component of fireworks is gunpowder, which is an inflammable and explosive product. The use of fireworks in large quantities will inevitably cause unnecessary hidden dangers. And the abuse of fireworks is likely to cause harm to people's health and irreversible impact on the environment. The government is concerned that the improper use of fireworks and the defective quality of fireworks will cause people to receive harm from fireworks. In order to avoid this risk and for the health and safety of the people, the European Union has launched a fireworks policy. The fireworks policy does not only stipulate how to set off fireworks but also stipulates the quality of fireworks.

Changes in European Union Fireworks Standards

It is understood that the European Union's import management system for fireworks and firecrackers mainly consists of fireworks directives, EN15947 and CE certification. EN15947 is a fireworks safety standard formulated in accordance with the Fireworks Directive and a common mandatory standard of the European Union. According to the relevant EU policies, the imported fireworks products can only be certified by CE if they meet the requirements of EN15947. Since 2013, EU CE testing has been more stringent.

Categorisation of fireworks 
Fireworks in the Europe Union are classified into four categories:

 Category F1: fireworks which pose very little danger (such as sparklers), and are intended for use in a closed space, including fireworks intended for use outside residential buildings;
 Category F2: fireworks which pose little danger, and are intended for use outside residential buildings in a closed space;
 Category F3: fireworks which pose average danger, and are intended for use outside residential buildings in a large open space;
 Category F4: fireworks which pose grave danger, and are exclusively intended for persons with specialised knowledge, often called "fireworks for professional usage".

The minimal ages set by the Directive are:
 Category 1: 12 years old
 Category 2: 16 years old
 Category 3: 18 years old

Category F4 fireworks are restricted to professionals throughout the EU. Individual member states are allowed to prohibit the sale, possession and usage of other categories by consumers as well, if they so choose. In Belgium, Germany and Denmark, amateurs cannot buy category F3; in the Republic of Ireland, they can neither buy category F3 nor F2. Germany and France have also raised the age for category F2 fireworks from 16 to 18.

Member state policies 

The EU's regulations on fireworks are the minimum standards for all member states, but the states are allowed to legislate on additional restrictions within their respective territories.

Belgium 

Since 5 July 2017, the sale of category F3 fireworks to non-professionals is a criminal offence in Belgium. The non-professional customer needs to be at least 12 years old for category F1 and at least 16 years old for category F2; the vendor is required to verify the customer's age. In Flanders, the Gemeentedecreet (Municipal Decree) gives the 308 municipalities of the Flemish Region the authority to introduce a required licence for lighting fireworks, or to prohibit the ignition of fireworks on certain locations.

Germany 
In Germany, amateurs over 18 years old are allowed to buy and ignite fireworks of Category F2 for several hours on 31 December and 1 January; each German municipality is authorised to limit the number of hours this may last locally. The sale of Category F3 and F4 fireworks to consumers is prohibited. Lighting fireworks is forbidden near churches, hospitals, retirement homes and wooden or thatch-roofed buildings. All major German cities organise professional fireworks shows.

Finland 
In Finland those under 18 years old haven't been allowed to buy any fireworks since 2009. Safety goggles are required. The use of fireworks is generally allowed on the evening and night of New Year's Eve, December 31. In some municipalities of Western Finland it is allowed to use fireworks without a fire station's permission on the last weekend of August. With the fire station's permission, fireworks can be used year-round.

Netherlands 
 

Fireworks in the Netherlands are mostly regulated by the Vuurwerkbesluit ("Fireworks Decree"), a 1993 law that has subsequently been amended many times to make the rules surrounding the production, testing, transportation, storage, trade, sale, consumption and overall safety of fireworks stricter and in harmony with other EU countries. During most of the year, most fireworks are restricted to usage by professionals, but there is an exception for ordinary citizens without any special training or licence to ignite fireworks during New Year's Eve from 6 pm on 31 December to 2 am on 1 January. Especially since the 2000 Enschede fireworks disaster, and more so since the accident-laden New Year's Eve of 2007/08, public discussion on more rigorous regulation or even prohibition on (consumer) fireworks has been frequent and ongoing.

Republic of Ireland 

In the Republic of Ireland, only category F1 fireworks (such as sparklers) are available for sale, possession and use to amateurs. This makes Ireland one of the strictest countries in the world when it comes to consumer fireworks.

The original law banning ordinary citizens from the purchase of fireworks, the Explosives Act 1875, was adopted when the whole island was still part of the United Kingdom. Subsequent amendments and additional acts were passed to make the policy even stricter. For example, because the 1875 Act did not contain a provision on the possession of fireworks, the law was amended in 2006 to ban amateurs from owning fireworks as well. A person selling, buying, owning or lighting fireworks from categories F2 to F4 without a licence is now punishable with a fine or even imprisonment. Only pyrotechnicians are allowed to ignite such heavier fireworks.

Sweden 
In the early 21st century, Sweden introduced more stringent rules on the use and sales of fireworks. In 2002, firecrackers were banned and in 2014, heavier rockets were banned. In late December 2018, it was announced that from 1 June 2019, skyrockets need to be launched with "control sticks", and anyone buying and lighting skyrockets must complete a special training course set up by the municipalities to obtain a permit; retailers may only sell skyrockets to permit holders. The illegal import and online sale of fireworks were anticipated problems of the new regulations.

Czech Republic 
According to 2015 law it is forbidden to fire rockets with more than ten kilograms of explosive substances at a time without license. Under ten kilograms is it not a firework (de jure), and the law does not impose any other limitations. No report or permission is needed.
For more than ten kilos of fireworks license and report to the municipal office and a fire brigade is obligatory. The fine for non-compliance is up to half a million crowns, one million crowns for a company. In reality, however, such notifications are minimal, and no one checks how many rakes are actually being fired.

See also 
European Firearms Directive
Fireworks law in the United Kingdom
Fireworks policy in the United States

References 

European Union
Cultural policies of the European Union
European Union law
Safety in the European Union
Culture of the Republic of Ireland
Law of the Republic of Ireland